The Biographical Dictionary of Chinese Christianity (BDCC) is a biographical dictionary which focuses on the lives of Chinese Christians and foreign Christian missionaries to China. It is published in both Chinese and English.

History 
The BDCC was initially modelled after the Dictionary of African Christian Biography (DACB) produced by the Boston University School of Theology, and was supported by the DACB and the Overseas Ministries Study Center. The BDCC began with already published biographical materials, especially from the Biographical Dictionary of Christian Missions (1998), and invites contributions from other researchers and institutions.

See also

 Christianity in China
 Jesuit China missions
 Protestant missions in China

References

External links
 

Religious biographical dictionaries
Christianity in China